Bowland railway station (Bowland Bridge between May 1849 and July 1862) was a railway station in the village of Bowland, near Galashiels, Scotland. Located on the now closed Waverley Route, it was opened to passengers on 4 August 1848, closing to passengers on 7 December 1953 and finally to goods services on 23 March 1964.  The line itself was closed and lifted in 1969, although the section of it which Bowland was on re-opened in 2015.

The station consisted of two platforms with a wooden waiting room on each and a small ticket office next to one of the platforms. A signal box, one siding goods yard and weigh bridge were all found near the site. There are very few remains of the station left, but a building near the sidings is still extant and the bridge over the B710 road next to the station is still there.

References

Disused railway stations in the Scottish Borders
Former North British Railway stations
Railway stations in Great Britain opened in 1848
Railway stations in Great Britain closed in 1953